Annie's Coming Out (also known as A Test of Love) is a 1984 Australian drama film directed by Gil Brealey. It is based on the 1980 book Annie's Coming Out which was written by Rosemary Crossley, with the assistance of Anne McDonald. The book tells the story of McDonald's early life in a government institution for people with severe disabilities and her subsequent release, as well as her therapist's attempts to communicate with her through the discredited method of facilitated communication.

Premise
Annie O'Farrell (based on Anne McDonald) is a 13-year-old girl with athetoid cerebral palsy who is unable to communicate and has been living in a government institution from an early age. Jessica Hathaway (based on Rosemary Crossley) is a therapist who learns to communicate with Annie using an alphabet board and comes to believe that although physically disabled, Annie is not intellectually impaired. When Annie turns 18, Jessica begins a legal fight to get her released.

Cast
Angela Punch McGregor as Jessica Hathaway
Drew Forsythe as David
Liddy Clark as Sally Clements
Monica Maughan as Vera Peters
Philippa Baker as Sister Waterman
Tina Arhondis as Annie O'Farrell
Mark Butler as Doctor John Monroe
John Frawley as Harding

Production
Film rights to the book were bought by Film Australia and Gil Brealey was assigned to direct. It was originally intended that Ann McDonald play herself but she had grown too big by the time she left hospital so 9-year-old Tina Arhondis was cast instead. Shooting started in September 1983 and went for four weeks, mostly at the Convent of the Good Shepherd in Melbourne.

Reception
Annie's Coming Out won three 1984 Australian Film Institute Awards for Best Film, Best Adapted Screenplay and Best Lead Actress (Angela Punch McGregor). It was nominated for four other AFI awards. The film won the Prize of the Ecumenical Jury at the 1984 Montréal World Film Festival.

The film was not a large commercial success but it screened in the US as A Test of Love.

Home media
Annie's Coming Out was released on DVD by Umbrella Entertainment in October 2010. The DVD is compatible with all region codes and includes special features such as press clippings, photos, and audio commentary with Gil Brealey, Rosemary Crossley, Chris Borthwick and Anne McDonald.

The film score recording by Simon Walker, produced by Philip Powers, was released in 2002 by 1M1 Records

See also
 Rapid Prompting Method
Films
 Autism Is a World
 Deej
 Wretches & Jabberers
Books
 The Reason I Jump
 Fall Down 7 Times Get Up 8

References

External links

Annie's Coming Out at Oz Movies
Obituary for Annie McDonald, 2010 at The Age

1984 films
1984 drama films
1984 independent films
Films shot in Melbourne
Films based on biographies
Films about people with cerebral palsy
1980s English-language films
Australian independent films
Films set in Melbourne
Facilitated communication
Universal Pictures films